A ghost bike (also referred to as a ghostcycle or WhiteCycle) is a bicycle roadside memorial, placed where a cyclist has been killed or severely injured, usually by the driver of a motor vehicle.

Apart from being a memorial, it is usually intended as a reminder to passing motorists to share the road. Ghost bikes are usually junk bicycles painted white, sometimes with a placard attached, and locked to a suitable object close to the scene of the crash.

History

The idea of painting bikes white originated in Amsterdam in the 1960s as an anarchist project to liberate two-wheel transport—white bikes were free, help yourself and then leave it for someone else.

The ghost bike idea in the United States may have originated with a project by San Francisco artist Jo Slota, begun in April 2002. This was a purely artistic endeavor. Slota was intrigued by the abandoned bicycles that he found around the city, locked up but stripped of useful parts. He began painting them white, and posted photographs on his website, ghostbike.net. San Francisco is one of the safer U.S. cities for bicyclists, but memorial ghost bikes sprang up there as elsewhere, changing perceptions of his project.

A ghost bike memorial project was started in St. Louis in October 2003. After observing a motorist strike a bicyclist in a bike lane on Holly Hills Boulevard, Patrick Van Der Tuin placed a white-painted bicycle on the spot with a hand-painted sign reading "Cyclist Struck Here".  Noticing the effect that this had on motorists in the area, Van Der Tuin then enlisted the help of friends to place 15 more "ghost bikes" in prominent spots in the St. Louis area where cyclists had recently been hit by automobiles. They used damaged bikes, in some cases deliberately damaged to create the desired mangled effect.

Similar projects began in Pittsburgh in 2004, New York City, Seattle in 2005, Albuquerque, and Toronto in 2006. In August 2005, nearly 40 ghost bikes were placed throughout Seattle to draw awareness to locations of crashes, near-misses, and poor road conditions. A ghost bike in Dupont Circle, Washington, D.C., commemorating a rider killed by a garbage truck in 2008, remained for a full year. When it was removed by city employees, friends of the rider replaced it with 22 ghost bikes, one on every lamppost. London Ghostcycle was active in 2005 and 2006. There have been similar projects in dozens of other cities worldwide. A bike memorial project was started in Durham, North Carolina, in 2013 to commemorate the death of two prominent cyclist and bicycle safety advocates.

In late 2013 and early 2014, the Houston Ghost Bike Group has placed 47 ghost bikes to raise awareness during an especially deadly string of traffic violence involving automobiles taking place in Houston, many of them hit and run. As of this posting, they are working on 13 more bikes to bring the list of deaths in recent years up to date.

There are currently over 630 ghost bikes that have since appeared in over 210 locations throughout the world. No single entity governs the installation of all ghost bikes, and they are sometimes removed by those who dislike the practice.

See also
 Ghost shoes (traffic fatality memorial)
 Bicycle safety
 Ride of Silence
 Vehicular cycling
 Vision Zero – worldwide movement to reduce traffic violence fatalities, serious injuries

References

External links

Information on ghost bikes around the world: Ghost Bikes (a project of OSM Belgium) and Ghost Bike.
Ghost Bikes in Chicago

Further reading

Types of monuments and memorials
Death customs
Cycle types
Cycling safety
Cycling activism